Utriculofera muricolor is a moth in the subfamily Arctiinae. It was described by Rothschild in 1913.

References

Moths described in 1913
Lithosiini